is a former Japanese football player.

Playing career

In Japan
Seto was born in Toyama Prefecture on March 14, 1978. After graduating from high school, he joined J1 League club Yokohama Flügels in 1996. He debuted in 1997 and played many matches as defensive midfielder in 1998. The club also won the champions 1998 Emperor's Cup. However the club was disbanded end of 1998 season due to financial strain, he moved to newly was promoted to J2 League club, Albirex Niigata in 1999. He became a regular player and played in all matches in 1999 season. In 2000, he moved to J2 club Oita Trinita and he played many matches. In 2001, he moved to Consadole Sapporo. However he could hardly play in the match. In July 2001, he moved to Gamba Osaka. However he could not play at all in the match. In 2002, he returned to Oita Trinita and helped the team promote to J1 League, and was also selected to the J.League All Star. He stayed there until 2005, when he joined JEF United Chiba, and in 2006 he transferred to Kashiwa Reysol. In 2007, he returned to his hometown Toyama and joined YKK AP (Now part of the merged J2 League side Kataller Toyama) in the Japan Football League (JFL).

In Singapore
In 2008, he moved to Singapore's S.League side Balestier Khalsa and was made the club captain. In the following year he left the club and joined another S.League side Geylang United and won the Singapore Cup.

Club statistics

Personal Honors
2009    Singapore National Team vs S League International Player All Star Team (member)
2008	 Captain – Balestier Khalsa
2004    J.League All- Star game

Team Honors
2009    SINGAPORE CUP (Champion)
2005    J.League Cup (Champion)
1998    Emperor's Cup (Champion)

References

External links

blog.goo.ne.jp (Official blog)

1978 births
Living people
Association football people from Toyama Prefecture
Japanese footballers
J1 League players
J2 League players
Japan Football League players
Singapore Premier League players
Yokohama Flügels players
Albirex Niigata players
Oita Trinita players
Hokkaido Consadole Sapporo players
Gamba Osaka players
JEF United Chiba players
Kashiwa Reysol players
Kataller Toyama players
Balestier Khalsa FC players
Geylang International FC players
Japanese expatriate footballers
Japanese expatriate sportspeople in Singapore
Expatriate footballers in Singapore
Association football defenders